Moestroff is a small town in the commune of Bettendorf, in north-eastern Luxembourg.  , the town has a population of 405.

Bettendorf, Luxembourg
Towns in Luxembourg